Hope Place (known in Spanish as Valle Esperanza) was a small settlement in Lafonia in East Falkland. It was set up in 1846, by Samuel Lafone, a British-born Montevideo merchant, on the south shores of Brenton Loch. It was mainly populated by Uruguayan gauchos brought in from continental South America. The area is now abandoned.

See also 

 Lafonia
 History of the Falkland Islands
 Origins of Falkland Islanders

References

East Falkland
Populated places on East Falkland
History of the Falkland Islands
1846 establishments in the Falkland Islands